The 2018 Newfoundland and Labrador Women's Curling Championship, the women's provincial curling championship for Newfoundland and Labrador, was held from January 2 to 7 at the Re/Max Centre in St. John's, Newfoundland and Labrador. The winning Stacie Curtis rink represented Newfoundland and Labrador at the 2018 Scotties Tournament of Hearts in Penticton, British Columbia.

Teams
Teams are as follows:

Round robin standings

Round robin results

January 2
Draw 1
Glynn 9-3 Miller
Hamilton 6-3 Roberts
Curtis 8-3 Sharpe

January 3
Draw 2
Hamilton 1-8 Strong
Curtis 6-2 Miller
Glynn 6-5 Roberts

Draw 3
Curtis 7-5 Roberts
Strong 6-3 Glynn
Sharpe 8-4 Miller

January 4
Draw 4
Strong 7-5 Sharpe 
Roberts 7-2 Miller
Hamilton 5-7 Curtis

Draw 5
Hamilton 7-5 Miller
Glynn 6-5 Sharpe 
Strong 7-6 Roberts

January 5
Draw 6
Sharpe 5-6 Roberts
Curtis 6-7 Strong
Hamilton 2-6 Glynn

Draw 7
Curtis 9-2 Glynn
Sharpe 4-5 Hamilton
Strong 8-6 Miller

Playoffs
Strong must be defeated twice.

Semifinal
January 6, 3:00pm

Final #1
January 6, 8:00pm

Final #2
January 7, 1:30pm

References

External links
Scores

Newfoundland and Labrador
Sport in St. John's, Newfoundland and Labrador
Curling in Newfoundland and Labrador
2018 in Newfoundland and Labrador
January 2018 sports events in Canada